The African Trade Union Congress (ATUC) was a national trade union centre in Rhodesia (later Zimbabwe). The ATUC represented black African workers, and was opposed to the system of white minority rule in Rhodesia.

The ATUC was formed in 1962 as the Southern Rhodesian African Trade Union Congress (SRATUC), a breakaway from the more moderate Southern Rhodesian Trade Union Congress (SRTUC). The new union was led by Josiah Maluleke, former Secretary-General of the SRTUC. The SRATUC absorbed the older organisation a year later in 1963, with the combined body adopting the name African Trade Union Congress. Following the split in the African nationalist movement in 1963, which led to the separation of the Zimbabwe African National Union (ZANU) from the Zimbabwe African People's Union (ZAPU), the ATUC became aligned with ZANU. The ATUC was affiliated with the African Trade Union Confederation.

The ATUC was reported to have nine affiliated unions during the mid-1960s, with a total membership of 29,198 (36% of all trade union members in the country). The largest single affiliated union was the Railway African Workers' Union (RAWU), which had approximately 16,000 members.

In 1981 ATUC merged into the Zimbabwe Congress of Trade Unions.

References

National federations of trade unions
Trade unions in Zimbabwe
History of Zimbabwe
Trade unions established in 1962
Trade unions disestablished in 1981